Kingborough District Cricket Club (KDCC) also known as the "Kingborough Knights" represent Kingborough in Tasmania's Grade Cricket Competition.

The KDCC fields teams in all Cricket Tasmania Men's and Boy's competitions, in addition to Women's Premier League and Girl's junior competitions.

Honours
Cricket Tasmania Premier League First Grade Premierships: (9) 1940–41, 1946–47, 1957–58, 1971–72, 1996–97, 1997–98, 2006–07, 2008–09, 2014–15

2006/07 Premiership Team
Adam French (captain), Stuart Clark, David Dawson, Mark Divin, Brady Jones, Tim Scott, Jake Steele, Brad Lovell, Luke Swards, Jason Shelton, Bryce Turnbull and Tom Bevan

2007/08 Premiership Team
Adam French (captain), Stuart Clark, David Dawson, Mark Divin, Brady Jones, Tim Scott, Rob Davey, Jake Steele, Jason Shelton, Brad Lovell and Bryce Turnbull

2014/15 Premiership Team 
Adam Maher (captain), Jason Shelton, Trent Rollins, Beau Webster, Brady Jones, Chris Bury, Brad Lovell, Clive Rose, Jake Steele, Shane Holland and Jackson Bird

Notable Past & Current Players

 Clive Rose
 Jackson Bird
 David Dawson
 Mark Divin
 Gerard Denton
 Michael DiVenuto
 Chris Matthews
 Umer Rashid
 Steve Stubbings
 Michael Bevan
 Mark Hatton
 Brady Jones
 Beau Webster
 Cameron Wheatley
 Adam Maher

External links
 Kingborough Knights Website
 Cricket Tasmania Website

1931 establishments in Australia
Cricket clubs established in 1931
Tasmanian grade cricket clubs
Sport in Hobart